Sung Dong-il (born April 27, 1967) is a South Korean actor. Sung made his acting debut in theater in 1987, then was recruited at the 1991 SBS open talent auditions. He rose to fame as the comic, Jeolla dialect-speaking character "Red Socks" in the television drama Eun-shil, though he later tried to fight typecasting by playing the son of a chaebol tycoon in Love in 3 Colors and a university professor in March. Following years of supporting roles in TV, Sung's film career was jumpstarted by hit romantic comedy 200 Pounds Beauty in 2006. Subsequently, he became one of Korean cinema's most reliable supporting actors, displaying his comic skills and easy charm in films such as Take Off, Foxy Festival, Children..., The Suicide Forecast, and The Client. He also had major roles in The Suck Up Project: Mr. XXX-Kisser, 3D blockbuster Mr. Go, and mystery-comedy The Accidental Detective. On the small screen, Sung garnered praise as a villain in The Slave Hunters, and a gruff but caring father in Reply 1997 and its spin-offs Reply 1994 and Reply 1988.

Sung gained a new surge of popularity in 2013 when he and his son Joon starred in Dad! Where Are We Going?, a reality/variety show featuring five male celebrities and their children on camping missions; his daughter Bin also joined him for the show's second season.

Filmography

Film

Television series

Web series

Television show

Ambassadorship 
 Public relations ambassador of the national park  with Lee Eung-bok (2021)

Discography

Awards and nominations

References

External links
 Sung Dong-il at SidusHQ (former agency)
 
 
 
 

1967 births
Living people
20th-century South Korean male actors
21st-century South Korean male actors
People from Incheon
South Korean male film actors
South Korean male television actors